Mnyazi wa Menza, also known as Mekatilili Wa Menza or Mekatilili (1860s-1924) was a Kenyan independence activist who led the Giriama people against the colonial administration of Kenya between 1912 and 1915.

Early life
Mekatilili was born in the 1860s at Mutsara wa Tsatsu in Bamba, Kilifi county. She was an only daughter in a family of five children. One of her brothers, Mwarandu, was kidnapped by Arab slave traders and was never seen again. At some point in her life, Mekatilili became married to Dyeka at Lango Baya.

Rebellion
Mekatilili's motivation for resistance was led by economic and social-cultural concerns. Mekatilili wanted to prevent any Giriama laborers from being employed by the colonial authorities, in order to ensure that they would remain in Giriama territory and only contribute to the well-being of Giriama people. She also was concerned about the increasing Western influence in Kenya, which she saw as eroding the Giriaman culture.

The colonial administrator for the region, Arthur Champion, held a public meeting on 13 August 1913, where he gave his demands to the community. Mekatilili played a major role in the meeting as she expressed her opposition to Champion's demands, with Mekatilili giving at the conclusion of the meeting a verbal oath that prevented her from working with or for the colonial administrators.

Mekatilili was agitated by what she saw as the erosion of traditional Giriama culture. The Giriama are a patrilineal community and women rarely hold leadership positions. However, Mekatilili was a widow. In Giriama society, women enjoy certain privileges, including that of speaking before the elders. She rounded up support for her cause against the colonial authorities due to the position she had attained as a strong believer of the traditional religion. In this, she was aided by the traditional medicineman Wanje wa Mwadori Kola. She gained a large audience through her performance of the kifudu dance. The dance was reserved for funeral ceremonies but Mekatilili performed it constantly from town to town, attracting a large following that followed her wherever she went.

Mekatilili and Mwadori organized a large meeting at Kaya Fungo where they administered the mukushekushe oath among the women and Fisi among the men who vowed never to cooperate with the colonial authorities in any way or form. The colonial authorities responded by seizing large tracts of Giriama land, burning their homes and razing Kaya Fungo. This led to the unsuccessful Giriama Uprising, known locally as kondo ya chembe.

Mekatilili was arrested by the colonial authorities on 17 October 1913, and exiled to Kisii in Nyanza Province. According to colonial records, five years later, she returned to her native area where she continued to oppose the imposition of colonial policies and ordinances. Mekatilili stated that Arthur Champion was solely responsible for forcing colonial policies on Giriama, which she claimed was eroding the traditional culture of Kenya. However, some narratives say that Mekatilili escaped from the prison in Kisii and walked over 1,000 kilometers back home to Giriama. She was later arrested and sent to a prison in Kismayu, Somalia where she also mysteriously escaped and returned to her home.

She died in 1924, and was buried in Bungale, in Magarini Constituency, Malindi District.

Legacy and Tribute 
During Kenya's 1980 feminist movement activists considered Mekatilili to be a symbol for the movement, as she was the first recorded Kenyan woman to participate in a fight for social change. On August 9, 2020, Google celebrated her with a Google Doodle.

Further reading 
 A Modern-day photography depiction of Mekatilili wa Menza by Rich Allela.
 Elizabeth Mugi-Ndua: Mekatilili Wa Menza : Woman Warrior (Sasa Sema Publications, 2000) 
 Elizabeth Orchardson-Mazrui: The adventures of Mekatilili (East African Educational Publ., 1999) 
 "A Socio-historical Perspective of the Art and Material Culture of the Mijikenda of Kenya", PhD Thesis, School of oriental and African Studies, University of London, London,U.K.
 2012 Max Dashu, 2012. Mekatilili: prophetess of the 1913 Giriama revolt.
 2020: A digital comic book by the Nairobi-based multi-disciplinary arts collective, The Nest Collective, titled "Mekatilili wa Menza: Freedom Fighter and Revolutionary."

References

External links 
Kenyan Heroes
Sasa Sema Publications
www.mekatilili.com

Giriama people
Year of birth missing
1924 deaths
20th century in Kenya
African resistance to colonialism
African women in war
Kenyan rebels
Mijikenda people
Resistance to the British Empire
Women in war 1900–1945